This is a list of National Hockey League (NHL) players who have played at least one game in the NHL from 1917 to present and have a last name that starts with "Q".

List updated as of the 2018–19 NHL season.

Q

 Bill Quackenbush
 Max Quackenbush
 Joel Quenneville
 John Quenneville
 Leo Quenneville
 Jonathan Quick
 Kevin Quick
 John Quilty
 Kyle Quincey
 Alan Quine
 Dan Quinn
 Pat Quinn
 Gage Quinney
 Ken Quinney
 Deron Quint
 Stephane Quintal
 J. F. Quintin

See also
 hockeydb.com NHL Player List - Q

Players